Síminn hf. (Iceland Telecom), previously named Landssíminn and Póstur og Sími, is an Icelandic telecommunications company. It offers communication services for both private and corporate clients, including mobile (2G/3G/4G/5G), landline (VoIP/POTS), Internet (ADSL/VDSL/FTTH) and IPTV services. Síminn also operates multiple TV channels and streaming services. Síminn is listed on the Icelandic stock exchange.

Síminn operates a 5G/4G/3G/2G mobile network reaching over 99% of Iceland's population. In 2018, Síminn was the largest wireless carrier in Iceland with a market share of 34,5%. Síminn has a partnership with Ericsson in infrastructure deployment in its mobile network.

History
Síminn is the privatised sector of Iceland's previously state owned incumbent postal and telecom operator, Póstur og Sími and later, Landssíminn. The Iceland State Telephone Service was founded the same year as telephone technology arrived in Iceland, in 1906. In 1935, the telephone and postal services were consolidated. In 1998, they were again separated, and the company Landssíminn, (Iceland Telecom Ltd) was split from Íslandspóstur (Icelandic Postal Service).

1906 Telegraph Cable
In 1906, a submarine telegraph cable was laid by the Great Northern Telegraph Co. from Scotland through the Faroe Islands to Iceland, where it came ashore on the east coast at Seyðisfjörður. In conjunction a telegraph and telephone line, was laid from the landing point to the capital city Reykjavík.

Telephony
The people of Reykjavík were quick to adopt the telephone. In 1912, the total number of telephone users in the town was 300. In 1932, the first automatic telephone exchanges in Iceland were opened. The laying of telephone lines in rural areas was completed around 1960. In 1986, all telephones in the country were connected to automatic telephone exchanges. The laying of fibre optic cables around the country began in 1985. The first digital telephone exchanges were opened in 1984, and this technology extended to all telephone exchanges 11 years later. In 2022, Síminn has begun the shutdown of the PSTN/POTS service, transferring customers to VoIP services, intending to be completed by the end of 2022.

Direct international dialling
Short-wave telephone communications with other countries were opened in 1935. The submarine cables, SCOTICE and ICECAN, between Scotland and Iceland and Canada and Iceland were opened in 1962. The cable allowed international subsea telephone calls and telex services to be established in Iceland. In 1980, the Skyggnir satellite ground station came online, and telephone calls to other countries then went via satellite and international direct dialling (IDD) to other countries became possible for the first time. In 1994, a new submarine cable, CANTAT-3, was opened.

Mobile Telephony
The 1G NMT system went into operation in 1986 (closed in 2010), and the 2G GSM system launching in 1994. 3G was launched in 2007, 4G in 2013 and mid-band 5G in 2021

Internet Services
In 1998, ADSL broadband was put into operation by Landssíminn. In early 2004, Iceland Telecom deployed its IPTV service to selected areas with ADSL service. The IPTV service includes Live TV and Video on Demand a move to answer customers' requests for bundled television, broadband and telephony services, which would signal Iceland Telecom's entry into the world of "triple-play" (integrated telephone, television and broadband offerings), distributing digital television content via the ADSL system. In 2009, Síminn launched its 'Ljósnet' service built on VDSL and FTTH (GPON) fibre technology. Initially offering 50Mb services, later upgraded to 100Mb for VDSL and 1000Mb for FTTH/GPON services. FTTH services reached 105,000 households in 2021.

Privatization and sale of Míla
In July 2005, the Icelandic government privatized Landssími Íslands and sold its 98.8% share to Skipti ehf. In December 2005, three companies, Landssími Íslands, Íslenska sjónvarpsfélagið (The Icelandic Television Company) and the parent company, Skipti ehf., merged and the name was subsequently changed to Síminn hf. In March 2007 the following proposals of Siminn's board were approved: A new parent company called Skipti hf. was introduced and Síminn was split into three companies: Síminn hf. the main operating company; Fasteignafélagið Jörfi ehf, a real estate company, and Míla ehf which owns and operates the national trunk and access networks in Iceland. The new structural change took effect from 31 October 2006. 

In 2021, Míla ehf., Síminn's infrastructure arm was sold to Ardian, raising 46 billion ISK, raising questions about national security infrastructure being sold to foreign investors.

Competition
The state owned Póstur og sími had a monopoly on most telecommunications services until 1998. That year a new law came into effect and the market opened for competition. The first competitor was TAL, offering mobile services on reduced prices. Others followed, the biggest one being Íslandssími. The ISP market the competition saw many new providers entering the market, such as Halló!, Margmiðlun, Skíma, Skrín, Snerpa, Íslandía, 365 Media, HIVE, NOVA, Hringdu and Miðheimar. In 2003 TAL, Íslandssími and Halló! merged under the name Og Vodafone. Og Vodafone has since then bought a few Icelandic Internet Service Providers including TAL and 365. On the 6th of October 2006, Og Vodafone changed its name to Vodafone Iceland.

See also

Telecommunications in Iceland
Internet in Iceland

References

External links

1906 establishments in Iceland
Companies based in Reykjavík
Telecommunications companies established in 1906
Icelandic brands
Internet service providers of Iceland
Mass media companies of Iceland
Mass media in Reykjavík
Privatised companies in Iceland
Telecommunications companies of Iceland